Roosevelt: The Story of a Friendship is a biography by Owen Wister, depicting his long acquaintance with Theodore Roosevelt, a Harvard classmate.  It was published in 1930.

References

1930 non-fiction books
Books about Theodore Roosevelt